Alton Little Theater, founded in 1933, is a non-profit community theater located in Alton, Illinois. Dorothy Colonius, a local English teacher, along with other educators and their students worked to create a community theater in Alton. Dorothy became the permanent artistic director and pushed for a permanent home for the theater. 

Alton Little Theater (ALT) is the oldest live theater in Illinois run continuous shows.  ALT traditionally produces five shows a year from September to May. As of the start of their 89th season in 2022, they have had over 500 productions. 

ALT regularly receives nominations for Arts For Life awards, most recently garnering several nominations (and two wins) for their 2009 production of Radio Gals.

References

External links 
Website

Theatres in Illinois
Tourist attractions in Madison County, Illinois